Jane C. Davies (born 9 November 1963) is a British physician who is Professor of Paediatric Respirology at Imperial College School of Medicine. She is an Honorary Consultant at the Royal Brompton and Harefield NHS Foundation Trust.

Early life and education 
Davies studied medicine at the University of Dundee. She graduated in 1987, and began paediatric training in London. She began to work at the Royal Brompton Hospital on cystic fibrosis. She earned her MD on host-pathogen interactions under the supervision of Andrew Bush and Eric Alton. She looked at the pathogensis of Pseudomonas aeruginosa. She worked at Great Ormond Street Hospital.

Career and research
Davies joined the National Heart and Lung Institute in 1999, where she has specialised in cystic fibrosis. Davies has been involved with the UK CF Gene Therapy Consortium since it was established in 2002. Davies worked on the development of Cystic fibrosis transmembrane conductance regulator (CFTR) gene therapy. She led the first trials of CFTR modulators in young children. She conducts bronchoscopic assays and electrophysiological measurements. She was made a Reader in 2009 and a Professor in 2013. Davies investigates cystic fibrosis. She was involved with a major UK trial of gene therapy for cystic fibrosis.

Davies leads the Strategic Research Centre for Pseudomonas Infection in Cystic Fibrosis at Imperial College London, one of few centres supported by the Cystic Fibrosis Trust. The centre looks to identify new ways to detect pseudomonas aeruginosa. Davies is part of the European CF Society Clinical Trials Network. She was involved in the design of the clinical trial, as well as validation of outcome measures. She works on the use of nasal potential difference to diagnose atypical cystic fibrosis. She was awarded a £2.8 million research grant from the Wellcome Trust to optimise the lentiviral vector for gene therapy.

In 2020 she won the Senior Investigator award from the National Institute for Health Research (NIHR).

Publications 
Davies publications include:
 
 
 2011 An Atlas of Investigation and Management. Paediatric Respiratory Disease: Vol 1 Airways & Infection
 2011 An Atlas of Investigation and Management. Paediatric Respiratory Disease: Vol 2 Parenchymal Disease

References 

1963 births
British paediatricians
Women pediatricians
NIHR Senior Investigators
Alumni of the University of Dundee
Academics of Imperial College London
Living people